Överfurir is a Swedish military rank (OR5) reintroduced in 2019, after having been abolished in 1991.

Duties
The överfurir is a Squad Leader at Skill Level C (Advanced). Promotion from Furir to överfurir requires a minimum time-in-grade of three years, although four years is preferably.

Earlier rank insignia

See also 
 Military ranks of the Swedish Armed Forces

References 

Military ranks of the Swedish Army